Bradley Lane tram stop is a tram stop in Bradley, Wolverhampton, England. It was opened on 31 May 1999 and is situated on Midland Metro Line 1. It is one of only a handful of Midland Metro stops to have an island platform. It is also has Park and ride facility.
The site is located on the exact border of Walsall and Wolverhampton and serves the areas of Moxley and Bradley, as well as Tipton and Darlaston.

It is situated a few hundred yards from the site of the old Bradley and Moxley railway station.

In February 2020 it was announced that a Park and Ride facility had opened at the stop.

Services
Mondays to Fridays, Midland Metro services in each direction between Birmingham and Wolverhampton run at six to eight-minute intervals during the day, and at fifteen-minute intervals during the evenings and on Sundays. They run at eight minute intervals on Saturdays.

References

 Article on this Metro stop from Rail Around Birmingham & the West Midlands
 Article on this Metro stop from thetrams.co.uk

Transport in Wolverhampton
West Midlands Metro stops
Railway stations in Great Britain opened in 1999